Kisielin massacre was a massacre of Polish worshipers which took place in the Volhynian village of Kisielin (Second Polish Republic until 1939), now Kysylyn, located in the Volyn Oblast, Ukraine. It took place on Sunday, July 11, 1943, when units of the Ukrainian Insurgent Army (UPA), supported by local Ukrainian peasants, surrounded Poles who had gathered for a ceremony at a local Roman-Catholic church. Around 60 to 90 persons or more, men, women and children – were ordered to take off their clothes and were then massacred by machine gun. The wounded were killed with weapons such as axes and knives. Those who survived (around 200 by some accounts) escaped to the presbytery and barricaded themselves for eleven hours.

Background

Kisielin massacre was part of a wave of the Ukrainian OUN-UPA massacres of Poles in Volhynia carried out between 1943 and 1944 during World War II. Among its survivors were parents of Polish composer Krzesimir Dębski, who in the early 2000s accompanied his mother to Kisielin. His trip was featured in Agnieszka Arnold's 2003 movie Oczyszczenie (Cleansing). Other survivors included also Faustyn Kraszewski, grandfather of Marek Jerzy Minakowski, but at least five killed belonged to his family.

The massacre was a subject of a 2009 Polish historical documentary film Było sobie miasteczko... produced by Adam Kruk for Telewizja Polska. The film recounts the tragic memories of the Polish Catholics originally from Kisielin as well as those of the Ukrainians peasants who remained, but also, it is a reflection on the eradication of Polish culture and tradition in the entire region of Western Ukraine, and the painful legacy that lingers.

References

 Genocide and rescue in Wołyń, McFarland,  
Description of pre-World War II Kisielin

See also 
 List of massacres in Ukraine
 Massacres of Poles in Volhynia

World War II crimes in Poland
1943 crimes in Poland
History of Volyn Oblast
Massacres of Poles in Volhynia
July 1943 events
Attacks on churches in Europe
Anti-Catholicism in Poland
Incidents of anti-Catholic violence
Massacres in religious buildings and structures
Massacres in 1943
1943 murders in Europe
Ethnic cleansing in Europe
Genocides in Europe